The Department of Environment and Forests, Government of Assam is a department under the Government of Assam.

See also
 Van Vigyan Kendra (VVK) Forest Science Centres
 Indian Council of Forestry Research and Education

References

External links

State agencies of Assam
Environmental organisations based in India
Assam
Year of establishment missing